This is Your Day is a Christian television show hosted by Pastor Benny Hinn and broadcast several times a week in the United States and globally by the Trinity Broadcasting Network, INSP Networks, The God Channel and various local affiliates to an estimated four million followers. The program began airing in 1990 and is a half-hour long.

Synopsis
During the program, Benny Hinn and his guests teach, read letters, pray, and show highlights from Hinn's "Miracle Healing Services." Hinn and his crew travel the world frequently, and a large part of the show is devoted to his global services, in which Hinn is said to imbue people with the power of the Holy Spirit. Many claim to have risen from wheelchairs, or to have been healed of other ailments. Towards the final portion of the program Hinn offers gifts such as books, CDs, DVDs and downloadable materials as a thank-you to viewers who donate to the ministry. He then prays for the prayer needs of his viewing audience.  Finally he concludes with an invitation for viewers to receive Jesus as their personal savior.

Controversy
The program has generated controversy due to widespread skepticism about Hinn's faith healings depicted in the show. Investigative news programs such as Inside Edition, Dateline NBC, and the fifth estate claim that Hinn uses the power of suggestion to make crusade attendees fall on stage and believe they're cured.

See also
 Good Morning, Holy Spirit
 Live Prayer

References

Religious mass media in the United States
Television series about Christianity
Evangelicalism in the Church of England
American faith healers
American non-fiction television series
1990 American television series debuts
2000s American television series
2010s American television series